Don't Tell Me Any Stories is a 1964 West German comedy film directed by Dietrich Haugk and starring Heidelinde Weis, Karl Michael Vogler and Georg Thomalla.

It was shot at the Bavaria Studios in Munich and on location in Trentino. The film's sets were designed by the art director Wolf Englert and Bruno Monden. It was shot in Eastmancolor.

Cast
 Heidelinde Weis as Martine Dörner
 Karl Michael Vogler as Dr. Nikolaus Feyl
 Georg Thomalla as Hugo Bach
 Ursula von Borsody as Rosalinde Bach
 Thomas Reiner as Dr. Waldemar Hecht
 Alice Treff as Die Tante
 Lothar Röhrig as Johann Sebastian 'Wastl' Bach
 Hans Stadtmüller as Ein Münchner
 Alfred Pongratz as Emmerich Mehler
 Stefan Patkai as Singender Barpianist
 Ulrich Beiger as Kunde im Schreibbüro
 Toni Treutler as Dame mit Brille
 Gerda Maria Klein as Fräulein Gausmann
 Kurt Zips as Herr mit Hut
 Paul Bös as Busfahrer

References

Bibliography 
 Bergfelder, Tim. International Adventures: German Popular Cinema and European Co-Productions in the 1960s. Berghahn Books, 2005.

External links 
 

1964 films
1964 romantic comedy films
German romantic comedy films
West German films
1960s German-language films
Films directed by Dietrich Haugk
Films based on German novels
Films about vacationing
Films shot in Italy
Bavaria Film films
Films shot at Bavaria Studios
1960s German films